Sekta is a village in the Imphal East district of Manipur, India. Sekta Archaeological Living Museum is situated in the village.

References 

Villages in Imphal East district